Aspidogaster is a genus of flatworms belonging to the family Aspidogastridae.

The species of this genus are found in Europe and Northern America.

Species:

Aspidogaster africana 
Aspidogaster antipai 
Aspidogaster ascidiae 
Aspidogaster chongqingensis 
Aspidogaster conchicola 
Aspidogaster decatis 
Aspidogaster ijimai 
Aspidogaster indica 
Aspidogaster limacoides 
Aspidogaster nilotica 
Aspidogaster parabramae 
Aspidogaster piscicola 
Aspidogaster tigarai

References

Trematoda